Monsieur Octave is a 1951 French comedy film directed by Maurice Boutel and starring Pierre Larquey, Marcel Pérès and Mady Berry. A recently retired railway worker borrows money to build a new house.

Cast
 Pierre Larquey as Monsieur Octave  
 Paul Azaïs
 Mady Berry
 Georges Bever 
 Raymond Cordy 
 Léonce Corne 
 Irène de Trebert 
 Édouard Delmont 
 Juliette Faber 
 Grégoire Gromoff 
 René Génin 
 Yvonne Hébert 
 Maximilienne 
 Gaston Modot 
 Marguerite Pierry 
 Marcel Pérès 
 Guy Saint-Clair 
 Louis Seigner
 Robert Seller

References

Bibliography 
 Maurice Bessy, André Bernard & Raymond Chirat. Histoire du cinéma français: 1951-1955. Pygmalion, 1989.

External links 
 

1951 films
1951 comedy films
French comedy films
1950s French-language films
Films directed by Maurice Boutel
French black-and-white films
1950s French films